Dayton is a city in Yamhill County, Oregon, United States. The population was 2,678 at the 2020 census.

History
The city was founded in 1850 by Andrew Smith and Joel Palmer. Palmer, who also served as superintendent of Indian affairs for Oregon, built a flour mill there. Dayton was named for Smith's hometown, Dayton, Ohio. Dayton post office was opened in 1851, with Christopher Taylor serving as postmaster.

There are many historic landmarks throughout the city. The oldest standing structure is the Joel Palmer House, built in 1852 or 1857. It has been on the National Register of Historic Places since March 16, 1987, and has been painstakingly restored. Since 1996, it has been home to a four-star restaurant of the same name as the historic house.

Nearby, in Courthouse Square Park, is the Fort Yamhill Block House, which was brought to Dayton in 1911 to prevent its demolition. The structure had been built by Willamette Valley settlers on Fort Hill in the Grand Ronde Valley in 1855 and 1856. John G. Lewis, a citizen of Dayton, secured permission from authorities to move the logs to Dayton, where they were reassembled.

Geography

Demographics

2010 census
As of the census of 2010, there were 2,534 people, 797 households, and 624 families living in the city. The racial makeup of the city was 79.2% White, 0.5% African American, 1.0% Native American, 0.9% Asian, 14.7% from other races, and 3.7% from two or more races. Hispanic or Latino of any race were 29.9% of the population.

There were 797 households, of which 48.6% had children under the age of 18 living with them, 58.8% were married couples living together, 14.1% had a female householder with no husband present, 5.4% had a male householder with no wife present, and 21.7% were non-families. 15.8% of all households were made up of individuals, and 6.2% had someone living alone who was 65 years of age or older. The average household size was 3.18 and the average family size was 3.52.

The median age in the city was 32.8 years. 32.6% of residents were under the age of 18; 7.8% were between the ages of 18 and 24; 26.6% were from 25 to 44; 22.9% were from 45 to 64; and 10.1% were 65 years of age or older. The gender makeup of the city was 49.6% male and 50.4% female.

2000 census
As of the census of 2000, there were 2,119 people, 641 households, and 516 families living in the city. The population density was 2,935.4 people per square mile (1,136.3/km2). There were 656 housing units at an average density of 908.7 per square mile (351.8/km2). The racial makeup of the city was 80.70% White, 1.56% African American, 1.18% Native American, 0.52% Asian, 11.80% from other races, and 4.25% from two or more races. Hispanic or Latino of any race were 26.19% of the population.

There were 641 households, out of which 49.6% had children under the age of 18 living with them, 60.4% were married couples living together, 15.1% had a female householder with no husband present, and 19.5% were non-families. 15.4% of all households were made up of individuals, and 6.4% had someone living alone who was 65 years of age or older. The average household size was 3.31 and the average family size was 3.66.

In the city, the population was spread out, with 36.7% under the age of 18, 7.7% from 18 to 24, 30.2% from 25 to 44, 17.7% from 45 to 64, and 7.6% who were 65 years of age or older. The median age was 29 years. For every 100 females, there were 96.0 males. For every 100 females age 18 and over, there were 96.1 males.

The median income for a household in the city was $40,556, and the median income for a family was $43,047. Males had a median income of $32,500 versus $23,125 for females. The per capita income for the city was $13,140. About 11.7% of families and 14.1% of the population were below the poverty line, including 16.6% of those under age 18 and 12.5% of those age 65 or over.

Economy
Dayton is a rural community, with many people involved in agriculture such as vegetable, berry, nut, nursery plants, wheat production and dairy farming. The vineyards and wineries located in the Willamette Valley AVA and the Dundee Hills AVA are an increasing source of direct economic activity as well as a source of visitors to the city.

Transportation
Dayton is served by three signed Oregon state highways and one unsigned state highway:
 Signed highways
 Oregon Route 18
 Oregon Route 221
 Oregon Route 233, which travels as one road with State Route 18 between Lafayette Highway to the west and Oregon Route 99W to the east.  
Unsigned highway
 Oregon Route 154 (SE Lafayette Highway) is assigned this route number south of its intersection with State Highway 233.

Prior to the construction of Highway 18 as a limited-access bypass of Dayton and McMinnville, Highway 233 continued east on its old route (SE Amity-Dayton Highway) into downtown Dayton, where it was named Ferry Street. The highway crossed the Yamhill River via ferry to the northeast side of the river at what is now called Alderman Park. There, Highway 233 continued northeast along SE Kreder Road to its northern terminus at what was then numbered as US Route 99W. During this period, the northern terminus of Highway 221 was located at its intersection with Ferry Street.

Government
Sometime in the late 19th century to early 20th century, land was donated for the construction of a city hall and library by a community member named Mary Gilkey. The current city hall and library used to be a firehouse. The library is part of the Chemeketa Cooperative Regional Library Service.

Education
Dayton has three schools within the Dayton School District: Dayton Grade School, Dayton Middle School and Dayton High School. The school mascot is the Pirate.

Notable people

Dante Rosario, NFL player
Dewey Sullivan, Dayton High School football coach; Oregon Sports Hall of Fame inductee
Paige VanZant, UFC fighter

See also
National Register of Historic Places listings in Yamhill County, Oregon

References

External links
Entry for Dayton in the Oregon Blue Book
Dayton community website

 
Cities in Oregon
Cities in Yamhill County, Oregon
Portland metropolitan area
1850 establishments in Oregon Territory
Populated places established in 1850